Lundazi District is a district of Zambia, located in Eastern Province. The capital lies at Lundazi. As of the 2000 Zambian Census, the district had a population of 236,833 people. In 2018, Lundazi district was divided into 3 districts (Lundazi, Lumezi and Chasefu) by the Government of the Republic of Zambia to enable rural development.The majority of the ethnic group is Tumbuka (99.9%).

References

Districts of Eastern Province, Zambia